The sport of football, the most popular sport in Senegal, in the country of Senegal is run by the Senegalese Football Federation. The association administers the national football team, as well as the Premier League. Some of the most notable players from the country include Roger Mendy, Jules Bocandé, Tony Sylva, Henri Camara, El Hadji Diouf, Sadio Mané and Kalidou Koulibaly.

League system
The Senegalese league system is divided into two leagues: Ligue 1 to Ligue 2, equivalent to the leagues in France and has been professional since 2007. The lower three are divided into Nationale 1 and 2 which are amateur levels. Until 2008, they were called Division 1, 2, 3 and 4. Senegal also feature cup competitions, a major cup being the Senegal FA Cup, which was founded in the 1980s. Another cup is the Senegalese Super Cup, which was known as the National Assembly Cup, created in 1979, the League Cup created in 2009 and the Champion's Trophy created in 2014.

History

Football in Senegal has been introduced around the 20th century during French colonial rule. One of the first clubs of the country were ASC Jeanne d'Arc and Foyer France Senegal. After independence, Foyer France Senegal became ASC Diaraf.  Numerous clubs were created in the 1970s and the 1990s. For many seasons, all of the clubs participating comes from the western part of the country where Dakar, Saint-Louis and Ziguinchor are located. The Second Division was created in the 1970s, the Third and the Fourth Divisions were later created and in the 1990s, the regional divisions were created. The newest clubs in Senegal are Diambars and Génération Foot, the two were in Ligue 1 as of the 2016-17 season, the latter spending their first season.

Diaraf is the leader in the number of titles numbering 11 championship and 15 cup titles. ASC Jeanne d'Arc is second with 10 championship and 6 cup titles. Next is AS Douanes Gorée and several more clubs, several have a title each.

Several clubs including Diaraf and Jeanne d'Arc competed in the continental championship and cup competitions, the two competed the most.

Stadiums

Stade Demba Diop and Stade de Diaraf are its busiest stadiums in Senegal and has the largest seating capacity, they are located in the capital Dakar.

National team

The men's national football team's greatest international success was reaching the quarter-finals of the 2002 FIFA World Cup, becoming only the second African team at the time to do so. The nation won their first Africa Cup of Nations title in 2021. They also reached the final in 2002 and 2019.

Seasons in Senegalese football

First-tier championships

See also
List of football clubs in Senegal
Sport in Senegal

References